Too Much Too Soon may refer to:

 Too Much Too Soon (album), an album by the New York Dolls
 "Too Much Too Soon", a song by Loverboy from the 1985 album Lovin' Every Minute of It
 "Too Much Too Soon", a song by Green Day from the deluxe edition of American Idiot
 Too Much, Too Soon, an autobiography by actress Diana Barrymore
 Too Much, Too Soon, a film based upon Diana Barrymore's autobiography